Tommy Freeman (born 5 March 2001) is an English professional rugby union player who plays as a wing or fullback for Premiership Rugby club Northampton Saints.

Club career
Freeman was released by the Leicester Tigers academy at the age of sixteen. In 2018 he joined Northampton Saints and the following year made his club debut in a Premiership Rugby Cup match against Sale Sharks.

International career
In October 2021 Freeman received his first call-up to the senior England squad by coach Eddie Jones for the 2021 Autumn Internationals. Freeman was also a member of their 2022 tour of Australia and on 9 July 2022 made his debut starting in the second test victory at Lang Park.

References

External links

Northampton Saints Profile
Ultimate Rugby Profile

2001 births
Living people
English rugby union players
England international rugby union players
Northampton Saints players
Rugby union players from Oxford
People educated at Culford School
Rugby union fullbacks
Rugby union wings